Five Bumpkins, also known as Five Clown-Kings Returns to the Village or A Troupe Comes to the Village, is a 1974 Vietnamese 35mm eastmancolor film by Mỹ Vân Films.

Plot
 Story 1: Love of Life (Tình đời)
 Story 2: Changing Lanes (Đổi ngôi)
 Story 3: A Hero Fears the Water (Anh hùng sợ nước)
 Story 4: When Male Kidnapper Meets Female Kidnapper (Bố mìn gặp mẹ mìn)
 Story 5: Two Love Letters (Hai bức thư tình)

Production
Location is Saigon, Xuân Lộc and Vũng Tàu in 1974.

Art
 Type: Comedy, adventure, feature.
 Studio: Mỹ Vân Films (Mỹ-Vân Điện-ảnh Công-ti)
 Print: National Cinema Centre (Trung-tâm Quốc-gia Điện-ảnh)
 Directors: Lê Dân (C. 1), Lê Hoàng Hoa (C. 2), Lê Mộng Hoàng (C. 3), Quốc Hưng (C. 4), Thân Trọng Kỳ (C. 5)
 Screenplay: Nguyễn Thành Châu (Năm Châu)

Cast

 Hồng Vân as the narrator
 Thành Được
 La Thoại Tân
 Lý Huỳnh
 Ngọc Tuyết
 Kim Ngọc
 Mỹ Chi
 Thanh Mai
 Thẩm Thúy Hằng
 Thanh Nga
 Túy Hoa
 Cẩm Hồng
 Vân Hùng
 Băng Châu
 Lệ Hoa
 Khả Năng
 Thanh Việt
 Kim Cương
 Ba Vân
 Xuân Phát
 Tùng Lâm
 Văn Chung
 Thanh Hoài
 Mỹ Chi
 Tài Lương
 Bảo Quốc
 Năm Châu

Broadcast
The movie has been released in 1975 Lunar New Year with Chinese, English and French subtitles.

  2 February 1975 : Photographic film.
  2 February 1975 : Photographic film.
  2 February 1975 : Photographic film.
  2 February 2012 : Betacam and DVD.
  2 February 2018 : Blu-ray.
  2 February 2018 : Blu-ray.

See also
 Four Oddballs of Saigon

References

 Five clown kings come to the village
 Sovereignty, Surveillance and Spectacle in The Saigon Fabulous Four
 Năm vua hề Sài Gòn bị hoa hậu áo tắm làm khổ

1970s adventure comedy films
Lê Hoàng Hoa
Vietnamese adventure comedy films
Vietnamese parody films
1974 films
1970s parody films